"The Queen" is a 2009 pop song performed by the Swedish singer Velvet written by Tony Nilsson and Henrik Janson. It competed in the third Semi-Final of the Swedish music competition Melodifestivalen 2009 on February 21, 2009 at the Ejendals Arena, but failed to advance to the Final.

Track listing
"The Queen" [Radio Edit] – 2:59
"The Queen" [Remix] – 3:38

Charts
The song debuted on the Swedish Singles Chart on the week of March 6, 2009 at number 13, and fell to number 20 the following week before moving up to number 15 in its third week. For weeks four, five and six, the song charted at numbers 32, 42, and 28 respectively.  "The Queen" is Velvet's eighth consecutive Top 20 hit in Sweden, and charted for six weeks.

References

2008 songs
2009 singles
Bonnier Music singles
Melodifestivalen songs of 2009
Songs written by Tony Nilsson
English-language Swedish songs
Songs written by Henrik Janson